Orthetrum is a large genus of dragonflies in the Libellulidae family. They are commonly referred to as skimmers.

The size of adults within the genus ranges from small to large; in Africa, the hindwing ranges in length from 22 to 50 mm. The bodies of adult females and recently emerged males are yellow to brown with black markings; these may facilitate identification of individuals to species level. Mature males, however, develop blue-grey pruinosity over most of their bodies - this makes species identification difficult without the capture of a specimen and inspection of the shape of the hamule.

Species
The genus Orthetrum includes the following species:

Notes

References

External links

Libellulidae
Anisoptera genera
Odonata of Africa
Odonata of Asia
Odonata of Australia
Taxa named by Edward Newman